MGM English Medium School, Rourkela is also known as Mar Greegorious Memorial English School is a co-ed school for girls & boys  from the Pre-Primary level to the Higher Senior-Secondary level in  Rourkela, India. The school is administrated by the Kolkata Diocese of the Malankara Orthodox Syrian Church. The School is affiliated to Indian Certificate of Secondary Education and Indian School Certificate, New Delhi.

Courses offered
The school offers primary, middle & secondary education. Classes I to XII have a Science,Commerce,Arts  stream at the senior secondary level. The School prepares the students for the Indian Certificate of Secondary Education and the Indian School Certificate.

Campus
The School is located in Jagda, Rourkela near to the sprawling campus of National Institute of Technology, Rourkela.

References

External links
MGM English School, Rourkela in Google Map

Malankara Orthodox Syrian church buildings
Primary schools in India
High schools and secondary schools in Odisha
Christian schools in Odisha
Schools in Rourkela
Educational institutions established in 1960
1960 establishments in Orissa